Everybody's Fine (Chinese: 一切都好）is a 2016 Chinese family comedy film directed by Zhang Meng. It was released in China on January 1, 2016. It is the second remake of 1990 Italian film of the same name.

Plot
Zhiguo Guan, a retired geologist, has been communicating with his four children through his wife for years. Although he loves them, he has a difficult time expressing it, as he sits in his home. After his wife died, Guan suddenly realized the distance between himself and his children. He expects to finally see his children at a family reunion, however, none of them are able to attend. He then travels to different part of the country alone to visit his "smug" and "grown" children. There are many funny, tearful stories happened during this experience.

Zhiguo Guan first visits his little son, Hao Guan, who is a photographer in Tianjin. He arrives at his son's studio and finds there is no one in the studio. He waits downstair for a day, but still, nobody appears. It later turns out that Hao Guan travels to Tibet and encounters snow slides. He is in the hospital getting treatments.

Zhiguo Guan then travelss to Hangzhou to visit his big daughter, Qin Guan. She divorces with her husbands and Zhiguo Guan finds out this fact only until this visit.

Next, Zhiguo Guan travelss to Shanghai to visit his big son, Quan Guan. Quan Guan resigns from his original job and decides to start up a business with his friends. He lives with his friends in small apartments. He has not told Zhiguo Guan, his father about any of these facts.

Zhiguo Guan travels to Macau to visit his youngest daughter, Chu Guan. Zhiguo Guan thinks his youngest daughter is a ballet dancer, but it turns out that Chu Guan works as a dummy ballet doll at a restaurant.

All of Zhiguo Guan's children were hiding their true lives from their father, just like the title of the movie, Everybody's Fine. But at the end of the movie, all the children comes home at Chinese New Year and the family finally reunites.

Production 
Ma Ke, a producer of the film, worked with William Kong to gain an adaption copyright license to make the Chinese version of the Italian film.

Inspiration 
Ma Ke stated that after watching the original Italian film, he aimed to create a Chinese version. He believed that the plotline of the film would be successful in China.

Cast
Zhang Guoli as Zhiguo Guan
Yao Chen as Qin Guan
Shawn Dou as Quan Guan
Ye Yiyun  as Chu Guan
Chen He as Hao Guan
Zhang Yi as Husband of Qin Guan
Zhang Xinyi as Chu Guan's girlfriend

Guest Role
 Zhou Dongyu as Taxi passenger
 Zhang Yibai as Scammer Playing Erhu
 Guo Yong Zhen as Guan Quan's neighbour

Critical Reception 
Douban, a major Chinese media rating site, rate the movie 6.5/10. 

A review article of the movie from Asian Film Strike called it "a visually pleasing fable".

Soundtrack

Box Office 
The film grossed US$2.76 million on the opening weekend, and a total of US$3.80 million.

References 

Chinese comedy films
2016 comedy films
Films directed by Zhang Meng
Chinese remakes of foreign films